Prostitution in Malaysia is restricted in all states despite it being widespread in the country. Related activities such as soliciting and brothels are illegal. In the two states of Terengganu and Kelantan, Muslims convicted of prostitution may be punishable with public caning.

There were an estimated 150,000 prostitutes in Malaysia in 2014 and that the country's sex trade generated US$963 million.

History
For 200 years, except in wartime, prostitution was only apparent in small areas of George Town, Ipoh, Johor Bahru, Kuantan and Kuala Lumpur, serving loggers, tin miners and sailors.

During the Japanese occupation of Malaya in the Second World War, the Japanese set up a number of brothels for their troops to "prevent the rape of local women by Japanese soldiers, to limit anti-Japanese resistance in the occupied area, to protect the soldiers from venereal disease and to avoid international disgrace". Many local women between 17 and 28 were forced to work in the brothels, employed as what were euphemistically termed "comfort women".

Starting at the end of the 20th century, prostitution has spread over the rest of Malaysia, particularly in the form of massage parlours, and "health centres".

Foreign prostitutes in Malaysia
Originally the prostitutes were locals, but there has been an influx of foreign sex workers over the last 10 years. Prostitutes from China, Myanmar, Vietnam, Thailand, Laos, and Cambodia now outnumber locals.

In 2012, the Anti-Vice, Gambling and Secret Societies divisions of the police arrested 12,234 prostitutes throughout the country, of which 9,830 were foreign nationals, including 5,165 Chinese, 2,009 Thais and 1,418 Indonesians.

Legal situation
There are no federal laws against prostitution but there are laws against related activities. Section 372 of the Penal Code criminalises soliciting in any place and living on the earnings of a prostitute. The latter is applied against those who run brothels.

The Prevention and Control of Infectious Diseases Act 1988 adds an offence of exposing another person to the risk of HIV infection.

Local health regulations prevent health and beauty establishments (which includes massage parlours) from employing sex-workers.

Various other laws such as those against vagrancy are also used against sex-workers.

Kelantan
The Sharia Criminal Offences Act, which brings Sharia law into force, is in effect in Kelantan. Sharia law allows fines and public whipping or caning for "any woman who prostitutes herself". Buying of sex is also forbidden. However Deputy Prime Minister Dr Ahmad Zahid Hamidi suggests this may only apply to Muslims.

Kuala Lumpur
Kuala Lumpur has a number of red-light districts where street prostitution, massage parlours and brothels can be found.

The most upmarket area for prostitution, and probably the best known, is Bukit Bintang. While the more downmarket is the RLD at Lorong Haji Taib where Indian, Chinese, and local prostitutes operate. Close by is the Chow Kit area where transgender prostitutes ply at night.

Changkat Bukit Bintang, Chow Kit, Jalan Alor, Jalan Hicks, and Jalan Thamibipilly in the Brickfields area are known red-light districts. Street walkers operate around Jalan Petaling. Another well-known place among locals is Desa Sri Hartamas located in the Segambut district, where massage parlours can also be found.

In the Klang Valley, Chinese, Vietnamese, Thais, and Cambodians work as Guest Relations Officers (GROs) in the karaoke and Japanese bars. After being brought a few drinks they will negotiate a price for sex. Indonesians work as dancers/prostitutes in the Dangdut Pubs. African prostitutes try to pick up customers outside nightclubs in Bukit Bintang, Jalan Sultan Ismail, and Jalan Imbi. There are also a number of escort agencies.

In 2012 some of the food courts in the Pudu district of Kuala Lumpur gained a reputation as locations where Chinese prostitutes solicited.

Sex trafficking

Demand for prostitution has created a problem of people trafficking for the purpose of forced prostitution from China and Vietnam, even as far as Uganda. A 2009 study by a church estimated that there were 30–32,000 victims of trafficking in the Sabah area alone. Victims are detained without access to legal, medical or social services in 'protective shelters'. After 90 days they are usually deported.

Child prostitution and trafficking is also a problem.

The United States Department of State Office to Monitor and Combat Trafficking in Persons ranks Malaysia as a 'Tier 2 Watch List' country.

Malaysian prostitutes in foreign countries 
In 2004 the United States Department of State reported that some Malaysian women and girls had been trafficked for sexual purposes, mostly to Singapore, Macau, Hong Kong, and Taiwan, but also to Japan, Australia, Canada, and the United States.

References